Selva Erdener is Turkish operatic soprano singer with the Turkish State Opera and Ballet. She studied at the Gazi University and attended conservatory at Hacettepe University in her hometown of Ankara. As a soloist with the Turkish State Opera she has performed in various works including Gluck's Orfeo ed Euridice, Puccini's La Boheme, Faust by Charles Gounod, Donizetti's Don Pasquale, I Pagliacci by Ruggero Leoncavallo, several Mozart operas (including Die Zauberflöte, Don Giovanni, Le nozze di Figaro, Cosi fan tutte).

Erdener performed the soprano vocals in "İnsan İnsan", a centuries old poem by the Alevi poet  that was set to music by the Turkish composer Fazıl Say.

Albums
 2000 - Sen Sen Sen (Kalan Müzik)
 2011 - Düşlerimin Toprağı (Kalan Müzik)
 2013 - Nereye Aşkım (Kalan Müzik)

References

21st-century Turkish women opera singers
20th-century Turkish women opera singers
Turkish operatic sopranos
Year of birth missing (living people)
Living people
Gazi University alumni
Hacettepe University alumni
21st-century women opera singers
Musicians from Ankara